The Shire of Queenton was a local government area located in North Queensland, Australia. It was located to the south of Charters Towers and existed from 1902 to 1916.

History 
Dalrymple Division was created on 11 November 1879 as one of 74 divisions around Queensland under the Divisional Boards Act 1879.

From as early as 1889, there were local residents seeking to create a separate local government area in the Queenton area.

On 2 July 1902, the No. 1 subdivision of Dalrymple Division was excised to create a separate Shire of Queenton.

On 23 Dec 1916, the Shire of Queenton was abolished and absorbed into the Town of Charters Towers.

Chairman
Elections for chairman were held annually in February.
 1902:  R.J.Sayers (used title of President of Queenton Shire)
 1903:  John Matthews (Acting), permanent chairman unknown
 1904:  J.Millican
 1905:  John Matthews
 1906:  
 1907: Alexander Hobson Pritchard
 1908: William Crocker
 1909:  Richard Carble
 1910:  W.F.R.Boyce
 1911: J.McLaren
 1912:  T.Chappel
 1913-1914:  J.Millican
 1915:  R.Carbis
 1916:  R.H. Millett
Council abolished early 1917.

References

Former local government areas of Queensland
1902 establishments in Australia
1916 disestablishments in Australia
Charters Towers Region